A wharf is a fixed platform where ships are loaded and unloaded.

Wharf or Wharfe may also refer to:

Places
The Wharf (Washington, D.C.), a multi-use development in southwest Washington, D.C.
Wharfe, North Yorkshire, a village in England
River Wharfe, in Yorkshire, England

Other
 Alex Wharf (born 1975), English cricketer
 The Wharf (Holdings), Hong Kong company
 The Wharf (newspaper), produced at Canary Wharf, London

See also
Wharf Theatre (disambiguation)
Warf (disambiguation)
Warth (disambiguation)
Worf (disambiguation)
Benjamin Lee Whorf, American linguist